Noel Arul (c. 1930 – 21 April 1993) was a Malaysian field hockey player. He competed in the men's tournament at the 1956 Summer Olympics.

References

External links
 

1993 deaths
Malaysian male field hockey players
Olympic field hockey players of Malaya
Field hockey players at the 1956 Summer Olympics
Malaysian people of Tamil descent
Malaysian sportspeople of Indian descent
People from Ipoh
Year of birth uncertain